Katway  is a village in Sadat Valley, Bamyan Province, Afghanistan with a population of 200 families from Sadat ethnicity. This village has mostly dominated  surrounded villages such as Bamsaray and Khalankash.
Its most famous personalities are: Arbab Mohammad Riza Khan and Arbab Sayed Riza, Arbab Sayed Mirza, and currently late Haji Fahimi, Ustad Zaki, Mohammad Nadir Shafaq, Mohammad Nasir Mudabir etc. This village may be spelled as Katwai as well.

See also
Bamyan Province

Populated places in Bamyan Province